The men's 200 metre individual medley event at the 2004 Olympic Games was contested at the Olympic Aquatic Centre of the Athens Olympic Sports Complex in Athens, Greece on August 18 and 19.

U.S. swimmer Michael Phelps blasted his own Olympic record of 1:57.14 to claim his fourth career gold medal in swimming. Coming from fifth place in the final turn, Phelps' teammate Ryan Lochte powered home with a silver in 1:58.78. Meanwhile, George Bovell held off Hungary's László Cseh by four hundredths of a second (0.04) to give Trinidad and Tobago its first ever swimming medal, in a Commonwealth record of 1:58.80.

Earlier in the semifinals, Phelps posted a new Olympic record of 1:58.52, previously set by Italian swimmer and defending Olympic champion Massimiliano Rosolino in Sydney four years earlier. Rosolino, along with his teammate Alessio Boggiatto, failed to reach the top 8 final with a tenth and eleventh-place effort. Tunisia's Oussama Mellouli, who placed fifth in the 400 m individual medley, also missed the cut, but set an African record of 2:01.11.

Records
Prior to this competition, the existing world and Olympic records were as follows.

The following new world and Olympic records were set during this competition.

Results

Heats

Semifinals

Semifinal 1

Semifinal 2

Final

References

External links
Official Olympic Report

M
Men's events at the 2004 Summer Olympics